Richard James Scanlon (born December 23, 1980 in Oradell, New Jersey) is an American football linebacker. He was signed by the Kansas City Chiefs as an undrafted free agent in 2004. He played college football at Syracuse.

Scanlon has also played for the Tennessee Titans and New York Giants.

Early years
Scanlon grew up in Oradell, New Jersey and was a standout player at Bergen Catholic High School, where he was named the New Jersey Defensive Player of the Year by The Star-Ledger (Newark, New Jersey) in 1998.

College career
He appeared in 43 games (27 starts) for Syracuse University and recorded 277 tackles, 4 sacks, two interceptions, three fumble recoveries, two forced fumbles and eight passes defensed. Scanlon graduated with a degree in Exercise Science, with an eye toward attending medical school.

Professional career

Kansas City Chiefs
Scanlon signed with the Kansas City Chiefs as an undrafted free agent in 2004, played with the Berlin Thunder in 2005 and remained with the Chiefs through the 2007 preseason, when he was released during final cuts.

Tennessee Titans
On October 31, 2007, he signed with the Tennessee Titans.

New York Giants
Scanlon was signed by the New York Giants on December 30, 2008, when Edmond Miles was released.

References

External links
New York Giants bio

1980 births
Living people
American football linebackers
Bergen Catholic High School alumni
Berlin Thunder players
Kansas City Chiefs players
New York Giants players
People from Oradell, New Jersey
Syracuse Orange football players
Tennessee Titans players